The expression Geneva School refers to (1) a group of linguists based in Geneva who pioneered modern structural linguistics and (2) a group of literary theorists and critics working from a phenomenological perspective.

Geneva School of Linguistics
The most prominent figure of the Geneva School of Linguistics school was Ferdinand de Saussure. Other important colleagues and students of Saussure who comprise this school include Albert Sechehaye, Albert Riedlinger, Serge Karcevski and Charles Bally.

The most significant linguistic book connected with this school is Cours de linguistique générale, the main work of de Saussure, which was published by his students Charles Bally and Albert Sehechaye. The book was based on lectures with this title that de Saussure gave three times in Geneva from 1906 to 1912. Sehechaye and Bally did not themselves take part in these lecture classes, but they used notes from other students.  The most important of these students was Albert Riedlinger, who provided them with the most material. Furthermore, Bally and Sehechaye continued to develop de Saussure's theories, mainly focusing on the linguistic research of speech. Sehechaye also concentrated on syntactic problems.

Charles Bally
In addition to his edition of de Saussure's lectures, Charles Bally also played an important role in linguistics. He lived from 1865 to 1947 and was, like de Saussure, from Switzerland. His parent were Jean Gabriel, a teacher and Henriette, the owner of a cloth store. Bally was married three times: first with Valentine Leirens, followed by Irma Baptistine Doutre, who was sent into a mental institution in 1915 and Alice Bellicot.

From 1883 to 1885 he studied classic language and literature in Geneva. He continued his studies from 1886 to 1889 in Berlin where he was awarded a PhD. After his studies he worked as a private teacher for the royal family of Greece from 1889 to 1893. Bally returned to Geneva and taught at a business school from 1893 on and moved to the Progymnasium, a grammar school, from 1913 to 1939. At the same time, he worked as PD at the university from 1893 to 1913.  Finally from 1913 to 1939 he had a professorship for general linguistic and comparative Indo-German studies which he took over from Ferdinand de Saussure.

Besides his works about subjectivity in the French Language he also wrote about the crisis in French language and language classes.
Today Charles Bally is regarded as the founding-father of linguistic theories of style and much honored for his theories of phraseology.

Works by Charles Bally:
Traité de stylistique française, 1909
Le Langage et la Vie, 1913
Linguistique générale et linguistique française, 1932

Recommended Literature about Bally's theories:
G. Redard, Bibliographie chronologique des publications de Charles Bally, in Cahiers Ferdinand de Saussure 36, 1982, 25-41
W. Hellmann, Charles Bally, 1988
S. Durrer, Introduction à la linguistique de Charles Bally, 1998

Geneva School of Literary Criticism
The expression "Geneva School" is also applied to a group of literary critics in the 1950s and 1960s, of which the most important were the Belgian critic Georges Poulet, the French critic Jean-Pierre Richard, and the Swiss critics Marcel Raymond, Albert Béguin, Jean Rousset and Jean Starobinski.  The critics Emil Staiger, Gaston Bachelard, and J. Hillis Miller are also sometimes associated with this group.

Growing out of Russian Formalism and Phenomenology (such as in the work of Edmund Husserl), the "Geneva School" used the phenomenological method to attempt to analyse works of literature as representations of deep structures of an author's consciousness and his or her relationship to the real world.  Biographical criticism was however avoided, as these critics focused primarily on the work of art itself – treated as an organic whole and considered a subjective interpretation of reality (the German concept of Lebenswelt) – and sought out the recurrent themes and images, especially those concerning time and space and the interactions between the self and others.

See also
 Structuralism
 New Criticism

Notes and references

 Terry Eagleton. Literary Theory: An Introduction. Minnesota: U of Minn., 1983. .

Further reading
 Robert Magliola. Phenomenology and Literature: An Introduction. Lafayette: Purdue University Press, 1977; 1978.

External links
The Geneva School of Literary Criticism''

Structuralism
Linguistic societies
Literary criticism
Schools of linguistics